Roy Rich (16 September 1911 – 24 March 1970) was a British broadcaster and film and theatre director.

Life and career
Rich was born in Plymouth, Devon, the son of a music hall comedian. Educated at Dulwich College, southeast London, Rich became involved in acting from an early age, making his theatrical debut in 1923. He was subsequently involved in theatre for several years.

He was a pioneering broadcaster for the BBC, as one of the first radio DJs. During the Second World War, he was standing in as a news announcer when Broadcasting House was hit by a bomb during the 9pm news broadcast. He presented Children Calling Home, a series of wartime radio broadcasts featuring conversations between evacuees and their parents. In 1964, he became head of BBC Light Entertainments (Sound), a post which he held until his retirement in 1967.

Death
Rich died from cancer in hospital in Stratford-upon-Avon in 1970, aged 58. He was married to actress Brenda Bruce; they had twin daughters.

Film and television credits
My Brother's Keeper (1948) - dialogue director
Broken Journey (1948) - associate producer
Miranda (1948) - associate producer
It's Not Cricket (1949) - director
Stranger from Venus (1954) - associate producer
Double Profile (1954) - director
The Sergeant and the Spy (1954) - director
Phantom Caravan (1954) - director
Rheingold Theatre (1955) - 6 episodes

Theatre credits
Black and Blue (London Hippodrome, 1939)
The Diary of a Scoundrel (The Garden Theatre, 1949)
Castle in the Air (Adelphi Theatre, 1950)
Thieves' Carnival (Arts Theatre, 1952)
Hobson's Choice (Arts Theatre, 1952)
As Long As They're Happy (King's Theatre, Glasgow, 1953)
Trial and Error (King's Theatre, Glasgow, 1953)

References

External links

1911 births
1970 deaths
British broadcasters
Mass media people from Plymouth, Devon
People educated at Dulwich College
Deaths from cancer in England
British film directors
British radio DJs
British theatre directors
20th-century British musicians